Turseodus is an extinct genus of ray-finned fish found in Late Triassic freshwater sediments of the United States. Two species have been described, T. acutus from the Lockatong Formation of Pennsylvania, and T. dolorensis from the Chinle Formation of Colorado.

Classification
Although previously placed in the paraphyletic family Palaeoniscidae, Turseodus was later referred to its own family, Turseoidae, by Wilhelm Bock. The lachrymal bone of Turseodus forms part of the oral margin, an unusual condition known otherwise only from the Early to Middle Triassic Pteronisculus. Based on this synapomorphy and other similarities, a close relationship between Turseodus and Pteronisculus is hypothesized. There are also similarities with Turfania from the Permian of China. However, a close evolutionary relationship between these genera has not yet been tested by cladistic analyses.

See also

 Prehistoric fish
 List of prehistoric bony fish

References 

Mesozoic animals
Prehistoric bony fish genera
Palaeonisciformes